The Equestrian Portrait of Philip IV was a portrait of Philip IV of Spain on horseback, painted by Diego Velázquez in 1635-36 as part of a series of equestrian portraits for the Hall of Realms, originally a wing of the Buen Retiro Palace in Madrid (a series that also included that of Philip's son prince Balthasar Charles).

External links
Velázquez , exhibition catalog from The Metropolitan Museum of Art (fully available online as PDF), which contains material on this portrait (see index)

Portraits of Philip IV of Spain by Diego Velázquez
Philip IV
Philip IV
Philip IV
1636 paintings
Philip IV
Philip IV